Úsov is a town in Šumperk District in the Olomouc Region of the Czech Republic. It has about 1,100 inhabitants.

Administrative parts
The village of Bezděkov u Úsova is an administrative part of Úsov. It forms an exclave of the municipal territory.

Geography
It lies in the Hanušovice Highlands. The Doubravka Stream flows through the village of Úsov. Polický Pond is situated northwest of the village.

History

The first written mention of Úsov is from 1260. The castle was built around 1250. Before 1487 the lords of Vlašim modified the castle. In the 16th century, Úsov was in the possession of the lords of Boskovice, an in 1597 it was acquired by the House of Liechtenstein. The Liechtensteins owned the castle until 1945.

The castle was damaged during the Swedish occupation in 1643. During the rule by Hans-Adam I of Liechtenstein, in 1692–1699, it was reconstructed and partially rebuilt into a large three-storey Baroque residence, designed by Domenico Martinelli.

In 1852 the Moravian-Silesian Silviculture School was founded in Úsov, which operated here until 1867. It was one of the oldest high schools in Moravia.

In 1860 there were 245 houses in Úsov with 2,662 inhabitants, of whom 950 were Jewish.

Jewish community

Presence of the Jews in the town was first documented in 1564. The Jewish quarter was established in 1589. In 1609, the community warranted its first rabbi. However, in 1643, the developing community was affected by the invasion of Swedish troops, which caused many loss of life.

Around 1645, the cemetery was established. The synagogue destroyed during the war was replaced by a new one in 1688. In the late 17th century, the community lived under the protection of Prince of Liechtenstein, and in the 1700s, the number of families reached 110. As a result of anti-Semitic tensions, a conflict ensued in 1721 and the synagogue had to be demolished in 1722.

The third synagogue was built in 1783–1784. Due to the constantly declining population, the local Jewish community was amalgamated with the neighbouring communities in 1890. Šumperk became the seat of the Jewish religious congregation. The synagogue was used until 1938, when the interior was demolished during the Kristallnacht. The Jewish community disappeared during the World War II as a result of the Holocaust.

Demographics

Sights
The castle houses a museum, which was founded here by Johann II, Prince of Liechtenstein in 1898. The Hunting and Forestry Museum contains a unique collection of trophies from Liechtenstein expeditions from around the world. There is about 10,000 exhibits and it is the largest museum of its kind in Central Europe.

The baroque Church of Saint Giles dates from 1736. Behind the church is a baroque granary from the late 18th century.

The building of the former synagogue is repaired and contains a museum exhibition. Near the synagogue is the Jewish cemetery. The cemetery contains about 500 tombstones and the oldest readable is from 1745.

Twin towns – sister cities

Úsov is twinned with:
 Lazany, Slovakia

References

External links

 

Populated places in Šumperk District
Cities and towns in the Czech Republic
Shtetls